The Bandama Natural Monument is part of the Tafira Protected Landscape on the island of Gran Canaria in the Canary Islands, Spain. It's considered a point of geological interest, because of the Caldera de Bandama. This volcanic crater, which is geologically a maar rather than a caldera, reaches 569 m (1,867 ft) above sea level at the highest point on its rim, Pico de Bandama, and is about 1,000 m (3,300 ft) wide and 200 m (700 ft) deep. The crater was developed during the last heavy eruptions 2000 years ago. It is recorded as the most recent volcanic activity on Gran Canaria.

The bottom of the caldera contains volcanic ash of different colors, and some botanic species of Canary Islands origin. An endemic bush can be found inside the caldera that doesn’t grow anywhere else; Dama de Bandama (parolinia grabiuscula).

The Caldera de Bandama is located at the meeting point of three municipalities: Las Palmas de Gran Canaria, Santa Brígida and Telde.

Gallery

References

External links

 Monumento Natural de Bandama, official info, in Spanish

Landforms of Gran Canaria
Volcanoes of the Canary Islands
Maars
Protected areas of the Canary Islands